Deborah Kay Davies is a Welsh poet, writer, and educator. She received her PhD from Cardiff University. In 2009 she received a Wales Book of the Year for English-language for the short story collection Grace, Tamar and Laszlo the Beautiful (2008). Her novels are True Things About Me (2010) and Reasons She Goes to the Woods (2014).

Born in Pontypool, South Wales, in 2014 she was living in Cardiff. She was an educator of creative writing at both Cardiff University and the University of Glamorgan. 

The film True Things (2021) is based on her novel, True Things About Me.

Books
Things You Think I Don't Know,  2006, Cardigan: Parthian Books 
Grace, Tamar and Laszlo the Beautiful, 2008, Cardigan: Parthian Books 
True Things About Me, 2010 (Edinburgh: Canongate Books); London: Faber and Faber, 2011

References 

Year of birth missing (living people)
Living people
21st-century British short story writers
21st-century Welsh novelists
21st-century Welsh women writers
21st-century Welsh writers
Anglo-Welsh novelists
Anglo-Welsh women poets
Welsh short story writers
Welsh women novelists
People from Pontypool
Alumni of Cardiff University
British women short story writers
Academics of Cardiff University
Academics of the University of Glamorgan
Welsh women academics